Angèle Hug (born 30 July 2000) is a French slalom canoeist who has competed at the international level since 2017. She competes in the C1 and K1 events, having competed in C2 Mixed with Théo Roisin in 2017. She is from Les Ollières-sur-Eyrieux in the Ardèche department of France.

At the 2021 European Championships in Ivrea, she won a bronze medal in the C1 team event, placing 16th individually. Hug finished 4th in the mixed C2 event at the 2017 World Championships in Pau.

She finished 2nd in domestic selections for the C1 event at the 2020 Tokyo Olympics, becoming Olympic substitute and securing a sport on the World Cup team. At her first World Cup in Pau, Hug placed 8th after qualifying third fastest into the final.

She finished 5th in the 2021 World Cup standings for C1, making two finals. At the 2021 U23 World Championships in Tacen, Hug finished 4th in K1 and 5th in C1. At the 2021 U23 Europeans, she finished 6th in both events.

Hug has four medals at the U23 World Championships with a gold in K1 team (2021), a silver in C1 team (2021) and two bronzes (mixed C2: 2017, K1 team: 2022).

Results

Complete World Cup results

Notes
No overall rankings were determined by the ICF, with only two races possible due to the COVID-19 pandemic.

References

External links 
 

Living people
2000 births
French female canoeists
21st-century French women